Tomah is a city in Monroe County, Wisconsin, United States. The population was 9,570 as of the 2020 census. The city is surrounded by the Town of Tomah and the Town of La Grange.

History

Tomah was founded by Robert E. Gillett in 1855 and incorporated as a city in 1883, but the charter was not issued until 1894. It is named after Thomas Carron (ca. 1752–1817), a trader at Green Bay who had integrated into the Menominee tribe. The Menominees pronounced the name Tomah or Tomau and he became known as Chief Tomah. Tomah was adopted as the name for the settlement in Monroe County on the unsubstantiated belief that Chief Tomah had once held a tribal gathering in the area.

In 1891, construction began in Tomah for a Native American residential school funded by the federal government. The Tomah Indian Industrial School opened in 1893 with six Ho-Chunk children as its first students and would become the most significant residential school in Wisconsin. The curriculum was designed to assimilate students into white American culture by replacing their indigenous education with Christian, English-language education. Children were forcibly removed from their families and sent to the school from as far away as North Dakota and Oklahoma. The school operated until 1941.

Tomah has three landmarks on the National Register of Historic Places: the old Tomah Post Office at 903 Superior Avenue, the Tomah Public Library at 716 Superior Avenue, and the Tomah Boy Scout Cabin at 415 E. Council Street.

Geography
Tomah is located on the South Fork of the Lemonweir River, a main tributary of the Lemonweir River, which is a large tributary of the lower Wisconsin River. The river is impounded on the west side of the city, forming Lake Tomah. Council Creek flows north through the east side of the city to meet the river.

The city is at the boundary between the hills of the Driftless Area in southwest Wisconsin and the flat, sandy, poorly drained ancient bed of Glacial Lake Wisconsin extending to the north and east of the city. The city's geographic coordinates are  (43.985089, -90.503922).

Demographics

2020 census
As of the census of 2020, the population was 9,570. The racial makeup of the city was 85.8% White, 3.2% Black or African American, 2.1% Native American, 1.5% Asian, 0.3% Pacific Islander, 1.6% from other races, and 5.7% from two or more races. Ethnically, the population was 4.7% Hispanic or Latino of any race.

According  to the American Community Survey estimates for 2016-2020, the median income for a household in the city was $51,304, and the median income for a family was $63,940. Male full-time workers had a median income of $44,787 versus $41,372 for female workers. The per capita income for the city was $31,656. About 5.5% of families and 6.7% of the population were below the poverty line, including 5.5% of those under age 18 and 6.5% of those age 65 or over. Of the population age 25 and over, 92.3% were high school graduates or higher and 23.3% had a bachelor's degree or higher.

2010 census
At the 2010 census there were 9,093 people in 3,900 households, including 2,194 families, in the city. The racial makeup of the city was 90.9% White, 2.6% African American, 1.7% Native American, 1.2% Asian, 0.3% Pacific Islander, 1.1% from other races, and 2.2% from two or more races. Hispanic or Latino people of any race were 4.0%.

Of the 3,900 households 31.3% had children under the age of 18 living with them, 38.3% were married couples living together, 13.0% had a female householder with no husband present, 5.0% had a male householder with no wife present, and 43.7% were non-families. 37.6% of households were one person and 14.4% were one person aged 65 or older. The average household size was 2.25 and the average family size was 2.96.

The median age was 38 years. 24.9% of residents were under the age of 18; 7.5% were between the ages of 18 and 24; 26.3% were from 25 to 44; 26.2% were from 45 to 64; and 15.2% were 65 or older. The gender makeup of the city was 50.2% male and 49.8% female.

2000 census
At the 2000 census there were 8,419 people in 3,451 households, including 2,098 families, in the city. The population density was 1,148.2 people per square mile (443.5/km). There were 3,706 housing units at an average density of 505.4 per square mile (195.2/km).  The racial makeup of the city was 94.95% White, 1.03% Black or African American, 1.65% Native American, 0.67% Asian, 0.08% Pacific Islander, 0.46% from other races, and 1.15% from two or more races. 1.41% of the population were Hispanic or Latino of any race.
Of the 3,451 households 31.7% had children under the age of 18 living with them, 45.2% were married couples living together, 11.4% had a female householder with no husband present, and 39.2% were non-families. 33.6% of households were one person and 15.0% were one person aged 65 or older. The average household size was 2.31 and the average family size was 2.96.

The age distribution was 25.8% under the age of 18, 8.0% from 18 to 24, 26.5% from 25 to 44, 22.0% from 45 to 64, and 17.7% 65 or older. The median age was 38 years. For every 100 females, there were 97.9 males. For every 100 females age 18 and over, there were 95.2 males.

Transportation

Tomah is a significant regional transportation hub because of its location where Interstate 90 and Interstate 94 diverge or come together, depending on what direction one is travelling. Both are important highways in the United States, with Interstate 90 continuing west to La Crosse, Wisconsin and Interstate 94 heading north to Eau Claire, Wisconsin and the Twin Cities in Minnesota. Tomah is also the Junction of US Highway 12, and STH 21, 16, and 131. Because of this, Tomah has a much broader range of restaurants and lodging facilities than other typical towns of its size.

Railroads
Tomah is also served by freight and passenger railroads Canadian Pacific, Union Pacific, and National Rail Passenger Corporation (Amtrak). 
Tomah station serves Amtrak's Empire Builder once per day per direction.

Buses
Commuter bus service towards La Crosse is provided three times daily by Scenic Mississippi Regional Transit. In addition, Greyhound Lines has an intercity bus stop in Tomah. (See: List of intercity bus stops in Wisconsin)

Airport
Bloyer Field airport (Y72) serves the city and is located 1 mile east of Tomah.

Education

Tomah is served by the Tomah Area School District, which has more than 3,000 students. The district administers seven elementary schools, a middle school, a high school, an alternative school, and a Montessori Public Charter School (grades 4K-3).

Elementary schools
 Camp Douglas Elementary (grades 2-5)
 LaGrange Elementary (grades 4K-5)
 Lemonweir Elementary (grades 4K-5)
 Miller Elementary (grades K-5)
 Oakdale Elementary (grades 4K-1)
 Tomah Area Montessori School (grades 4K-4)
 Warrens Elementary (grades 4K-5)
 Wyeville Elementary (grades K-5)

Middle school
 Tomah Middle School (grades 6-8)

High school 
 Tomah High School (grades 9-12)

Alternative school
 Robert Kupper Learning Center (grade 6-age 20)

There are two private schools in Tomah: Queen of the Apostles (grades 4K-8) and 
St. Paul Lutheran School of the Wisconsin Evangelical Lutheran Synod (grades preK-8).

Health and medical
Four health care facilities are located in Tomah: Tomah Health, Gundersen Health, the Tomah VA Medical Center, and the Lake Tomah Clinic of Mayo Health System.

Parks and recreation 
Tomah has 11 parks, a citywide recreation trail, and an aquatic center. The Tomah Parks and Recreation Department administers recreational programs for youth and adults.

Notable people

 Adelbert Bleekman, Wisconsin State Senator
 Herbert Eugene Bolton, Spanish borderlands scholar and director of the Bancroft Library; graduated from Tomah High School
 Charles K. Erwin, Wisconsin State Senator
 Anne Nicol Gaylor, advocate
 Glenn L. Henry, lawyer and member of the Wisconsin State Assembly 
 Jay R. Hinckley, member of the Wisconsin State Assembly
 Miles Hineman, member of the Wisconsin State Assembly
 William Washington Howes, first Assistant Postmaster General of the United States
 Kyle Kenyon, lawyer and legislator
 Frank King, creator of the comic strip Gasoline Alley; grew up in Tomah.
 Thomas McCaul, mayor of Tomah
 Frank Augustus Miller, builder of the Mission Inn in Riverside, California
 Lewis T. Mittness, member of the Wisconsin State Assembly
 Charles Quigg, member of the Wisconsin State Assembly and physician
 Arthur Claude Ruge, engineer
 John Emmet Sheridan, illustrator, was born in Tomah.
 Kenneth E. Stumpf, Congressional Medal of Honor recipient
 Ed Thompson, mayor of Tomah, Wisconsin gubernatorial candidate, State Senate candidate
 Bert D. Thorp, member of the Wisconsin State Assembly
 James Tormey, member of the Wisconsin State Assembly
 Lynn Pulou-Alaimalo, author and first Samoan female educator in Tomah

References

External links

 City of Tomah
 Sanborn fire insurance maps: 1885 1891 1897 1904 1912 1922

Cities in Wisconsin
Cities in Monroe County, Wisconsin
Populated places established in 1855
1855 establishments in Wisconsin